Da Lench Mob was an American hip hop group from Los Angeles, California, associated with Ice Cube. The group consisted of rappers Shorty, T-Bone, J-Dee, Maulkie, and Ice Cube. Their Islamic religious and social politically inspired-lyrics garnered much attention.

History
The group made its debut on Ice Cube's first solo album, AmeriKKKa's Most Wanted. At that time, the name referred to all of the performers on the album (including Ice Cube), rather than the distinct group it would become. At first the name was also spelled "The" rather than "Da" on the album sleeve.

With Ice Cube as its executive producer, Da Lench Mob released its debut album, Guerillas in tha Mist, in 1992. At this time the group consisted of J-Dee, Shorty, and T-Bone, who were also pictured on the album cover. The video for the album's lead single, also titled "Guerillas in tha Mist", became popular in the fall of 1992. The 2004 video game Grand Theft Auto: San Andreas featured "Guerillas in tha Mist", appearing on the fictional radio station Radio Los Santos.

J-Dee was arrested and charged with murder in 1993. Instead of disbanding, the group brought in South Central Los Angeles-based rapper Maulkie (former member of the Ruthless Records group Yomo & Maulkie) for its second album Planet of da Apes, released in 1994. They broke up soon afterwards due to a rift over money and other differences.

J-Dee was sentenced to 29 years in prison, less three years for time served, in 1995. Shorty died on June 16, 2019. J-Dee was released on parole in 2021, after serving 25 years.

Discography

Albums

Singles

References

Ice Cube
Hip hop groups from California
Musical groups from Los Angeles
Rappers from Los Angeles
Priority Records artists
1990 establishments in California
Musical groups established in 1990
1995 disestablishments in California
Musical groups disestablished in 1995
Islamic music albums by American artists
African-American Muslims